Bradford Harris (July 16, 1933 – November 7, 2017) was an American actor, stuntman, and executive producer. He appeared in a variety of roles in over 50 films, mostly in European productions. He was an inductee in the Stuntman's Hall of Fame.

Life and career 
Born in St. Anthony, Idaho, Harris' family moved to California, where he attended Burbank High School, then received an athletic scholarship to UCLA where he studied economics. When he injured his knee playing football he was advised to take up weightlifting to strengthen the injury that developed his interest in bodybuilding.

Harris entered films as a stand-in, stuntman, and later an actor. His first roles were in André de Toth's Monkey on My Back and Li'l Abner. With his athletic physique, Harris travelled to Rome to watch the 1960 Summer Olympics and perform stunts in Stanley Kubrick's Spartacus. He stayed in Europe for the boom in European sword and sandal, Eurospy, and Spaghetti Western genres.

Harris discovered, when working in Germany, that stunt coordinators were nonexistent in that country and he often did extra duties as a stuntman, stunt coordinator, and second unit director as well as an actor.

Harris made his debut as a leading man in 1961 in the title role of Gianfranco Parolini's Goliath Against the Giants and Samson. He would have a long, continuing relationship in several films written and directed by Parolini. Harris also began to be teamed with Tony Kendall, starting with the Western Pirates of the Mississippi. He later married his co-star in Black Eagle of Santa Fe, the sequel to that film.

He married Czech actress Olga Schoberová on November 16, 1967 and divorced in 1969. They had a daughter named Babrinka (Sabrina).

Harris teamed again with Kendall and Parolini in the Kommissar X series, and The Three Fantastic Supermen/I Fantastici Tre Supermen (1967) series.

He served as executive producer on several of his films including King of Kong Island (which he also starred in) and Jack Cardiff's The Mutations. He later made seven appearances on the American soap opera Falcon Crest as "Deputy Duffy". His most recent film was the Andrea Zaccariello's comedy Boom, released in 1999.

Harris invented and marketed exercise products called "AB-OrigOnals." He owned a company called Modern Body Design. In 2015 he was awarded the University of Arizona College of Humanities’ Distinguished Lifetime Achievement Award in the Humanities. He died on November 7, 2017, at the age of 84.

Selected filmography
 The McConnell Story (1955) - Pilot (uncredited)
 Monkey on My Back (1957) - Spike McAvoy
 Speed Crazy (1959) - Bit Part (uncredited)
 Li'l Abner (1959) - Muscleman Luke (uncredited)
 Tall Story (1960) - Student by Fire (uncredited)
 13 Fighting Men (1960) - Pvt. Fowler
 Ocean's 11 (1960) - Minor Role (uncredited)
 Spartacus (1960) - Gladiator / Soldier (uncredited)
 Goliath Against the Giants (1961) - Goliath
 Samson (1961) - Samson
 The Fury Of Hercules (1962) - Hercules
 The Hot Port of Hong Kong (1962) - Polizeiinspektor McLean
 It Happened in Athens (1962) - Garrett (uncredited)
 79 A.D. (1962) - Marcus Tiberius
 The Old Testament (1962) - Simone
 The Black Panther of Ratana (1963) - Larry Finch
 The Pirates of the Mississippi (1963) - Tom Cook
 Mission to Hell (1964) - Joe Warren
 Mystery of the Red Jungle (1964) - Larry McLean
 The Secret of the Chinese Carnation (1964) - Donald Ramsey
 Massacre at Marble City (1964) - Phil Stone
 Black Eagle of Santa Fe (1965) - Cliff McPherson
 Our Man in Jamaica (1965) - Captain Mike Jefferson
 Kiss Kiss, Kill Kill (1966) - Capt. Tom Rowland
 Kommissar X – Drei gelbe Katzen (aka Death is Nimble, Death is Quick) (1966) - Capt. Tom Rowland
 Kommissar X – In den Klauen des goldenen Drachen (aka So Darling So Deadly) (1966) - Capt. Tom Rowland
 The Three Fantastic Supermen (1967) - Brad McCallum
 The Ten Million Dollar Grab (1967) - Robert Colman
 Kommissar X – Drei grüne Hunde (aka Death Trip) (1967) - Capt. Tom Rowland
 Spy Today, Die Tomorrow (1967) - Cliff
 Un hombre vino a matar (1967) - Sheriff Bill Manners
 Kommissar X - Drei blaue Panther (1968) - Capt. Tom Rowland
 Cin cin... cianuro (1968) - George
 King of Kong Island (1968) - Burt Dawson
 Kommissar X – Drei goldene Schlangen (1969) - Capt. Tom Rowland
 Poppea's Hot Nights (1969) - Claudio Valerio
 Patton (1970) - Sergeant in Bar (uncredited)
 Che fanno i nostri supermen tra le vergini della jungla? (1970) - Captain Brad Scott
 Quando suona la campana (1970) - Don Vincenzo
  (1970) - Ken Stark
  (1970) - Sabata
 The Mad Butcher (1971) - Mike Lawrence
 Arriva Durango... paga o muori (1971) - Durango
 Il ritorno del gladiatore più forte del mondo (1971) - Marzio
 Kommissar X jagt die roten Tiger (aka Tiger Gang) (1971) - Capt. Tom Rowland
 Seminò morte... lo chiamavano il Castigo di Dio! (1972) - Django / Durango
 Zambo, il dominatore della foresta (1972) - George Ryon aka Zambo
 Questa volta ti faccio ricco! (1974) - Brad McCoy
 The Girl in Room 2A (1974) - Charlie
 The Mutations (1974) - Brian Redford
 Who Breaks... Pays (1975) - Placido 
 Lady Dracula (1977) - Kommissar
 The Beast in Heat (1977) - Don Lorenzo (uncredited)
 Brass Target (1978) - Lt. Rowan
 Zwei tolle Käfer räumen auf (1979) - Don Fernando Hidalgo
 Mie jue qi qi (1980) - Leopard
 Good-bye, Cruel World (1983) - Policeman
 Hercules (1983) - King Augeias
 The Seven Magnificent Gladiators (1983) - Scipio
 Death Stone (1987) - Brain
 Boom (1999) - Gordon Steele (segment "Il figlio di Maciste")
 Shiver (2012) - The Captain (final film role)

References

External links
 
 
 Brad Harris bio on (re)Search my Trash

1933 births
2017 deaths
20th-century American male actors
American bodybuilders
American expatriates in Italy
American male film actors
American male soap opera actors
American stunt performers
Male actors from Idaho
Male Spaghetti Western actors
People associated with physical culture
People from St. Anthony, Idaho